Hard work is carefulness and persistent effort or work.

It may also mean:
 Hard Work (album), by John Handy
 Hard Work (book), by Polly Toynbee